Rapala is a genus of butterflies in the tribe Deudorigini of the subfamily Theclinae of the family Lycaenidae. They are found throughout South Asia and Southeast Asia, with a few species extending to Australia and into the eastern Palaearctic region.

Males of Rapala are differentiated from other genera in the Deudorigini by their genitalia, with the conjoined valvae tapering evenly to rounded apices. The male secondary sexual characters also differ. In every species there is a brand above the origin of vein seven and lying wholly within space seven, clothed with very small scent scales, and nearly always there is an associated erectile hair tuft on the forewing dorsum beneath.

Almost all species exhibit sexual dimorphism in the colour of the upperside; normally the male is red, reddish brown or deep blue, while the female is dark brown or pale purple blue.

Selected species
 Rapala arata (Bremer, 1861)
 Rapala cassidyi
 Rapala christopheri (Lane & Müller, 2006)
 Rapala dioetas
 Rapala diopites
 Rapala iarbus
 Rapala lankana
 Rapala melampus
 Rapala manea (Hewitson, [1863])
 Rapala melida
 Rapala nemorensis Oberthür, 1914
 Rapala repercussa Leech, 1890
 Rapala rhoecus
 Rapala schistacea
 Rapala scintilla
 Rapala selira
 Rapala sphinx
 Rapala suffusa
 Rapala tomokoae H. Hayashi, Schrőder & Treadaway, [1978]
 Rapala varuna

References

External links
Images representing Rapala at Consortium for the Barcode of Life
"Rapala Moore, [1881]" at Markku Savela's Lepidoptera and Some Other Life Forms

 
Lycaenidae genera
Taxa named by Frederic Moore